Syd Jacobs is an American paralympic swimmer. She competed at the 1976 Summer Paralympics, winning two silver and three bronze medals. Jacobs works for the National Park Service.

References 

American female swimmers
Paralympic swimmers of the United States
Swimmers at the 1976 Summer Paralympics
Swimmers at the 1980 Summer Paralympics
Medalists at the 1976 Summer Paralympics
Medalists at the 1980 Summer Paralympics
Paralympic silver medalists for the United States
Paralympic bronze medalists for the United States
Paralympic medalists in swimming
20th-century American women